The Last of the Mohicans is a 1971 BBC serial, based on the 1826 novel of the same name by James Fenimore Cooper, directed by David Maloney.

It was shown during the Sunday tea time slot on BBC One, which for several years showed fairly faithful adaptations of classic novels aimed at a family audience.  In 1972 it was shown in America as part of the Masterpiece Theatre series.

The serial consisted of eight 45-minute episodes.

Near the start, Chingachook introduces his son Uncas, saying "Uncas is the last of the Mohicans".  After Uncas is killed, the final line in the serial is Chingachgook saying in a sad voice, "I am the last of the Mohicans".

The serial was responsible for popularising the term "Mohican hairstyle" for what is known as a Mohawk hairstyle in the US, although it was actually worn by the Hurons not the Mohicans in the serial.

This production was released on DVD, distributed by Acorn Media UK.

Sequel
In 1973 the BBC made a sequel Hawkeye, the Pathfinder, also with Abineri as Chingachook but with Paul Massie as Hawkeye. It was produced for North America by 20th Century-Fox Television and broadcast by ABC in the United States.

Cast
Colonel Munro: Andrew Crawford
Major Duncan Heyward: Tim Goodman
Hawkeye: Kenneth Ives	
Magua: Philip Madoc
Chingachgook: John Abineri
Uncas: Richard Warwick	
Cora Munro: Patricia Maynard	
Alice Munro: Joanna David

Reception
It is considered by some people to be the most faithful and the best of the various film and TV adaptations of The Last of the Mohicans, as well as one of the best of the BBC's Sunday adaptations.  Compared with some other adaptations of the novel it was made on a relatively low budget (much of it was shot in the studio, although there were scenes shot on location in Scotland) and it included some dated elements (the American Indians were all played by white actors in make up).  However it was praised for the quality of the acting, particularly the performance as Magua by Philip Madoc, an experienced Welsh TV actor who often played villains, and Richard Warwick as Uncas.

In a contemporary review in The New York Times John J. O'Connor criticized the "natural handicap of vocal accents" of British actors portraying Native Americans. He summarized; "The over‐all production, complete with forest battles and canoe joustings, is excellent. The color photography is first‐rate. And most of the performances, in the B.B.C. tradition, are superb."

References

External links

BBC television dramas
Television shows based on American novels
Films based on The Last of the Mohicans
1971 British television series debuts
1971 British television series endings